
Taşucu (Greek: Ὅλμοι, Holmoi) is a small town of Silifke, Mersin Province, Turkey. It obtained the status of Municipality after the local elections in Turkey, 1955. By the new regulations on the constitution, it legally got the status of Mahalle again in 2014. The population was 8,847 as of 2012.

During the Syrian Civil War the pier was used to ship weapons to Syrian rebel groups as part of the U.S. Timber Sycamore program.

Transportation
Taşucu is the main ferry terminal to Kyrenia (Girne), the main port of Northern Cyprus.

Culture
The collections of amphoras donated by Arslan Eyce were gathered in Arslan Eyce Private Amphora Museum of Taşucu (Turkish: Taşucu Amfora Müzesi) by the Ministry of Culture and Tourism in 1997.

International relations

Twin towns — Sister cities
Before the regulation on the constitution of Turkey, the town used to be twinned with:
  Bergkamen, Germany

References

External links
 Taşucu Municipality's official website
 Taşucu's website
 http://www.kulturvarliklari.gov.tr/TR,44043/mersin-tasucu-arslan-eyce-amphora-muzesi.html
 http://www.tasucuamphoramuzesi.com/tr/t-c-kultur-ve-turizm-bakanligi-arslan-eyce-ozel-amphora-muzesi-1997/

Populated places in Mersin Province
Populated coastal places in Turkey
Tourist attractions in Mersin Province
Fishing communities in Turkey
Towns in Turkey
Populated places in Silifke District